Jamshed Nowroji Vazifdar, popularly known as Jimmy, was a Parsi physician from India and a former secretary of the Indian Red Cross Society at its Maharashtra Chapter. Born in Mumbai and graduated in medicine in 1946, he is known to have contributed to the blood transfusion movement in India. The Government of India awarded him the fourth highest Indian civilian award of Padma Shri in 1973. He died in 2000.

References

Recipients of the Padma Shri in medicine
2000 deaths
Medical doctors from Mumbai
Parsi people from Mumbai
20th-century Indian medical doctors
Year of birth missing